is Japanese journalist and writer. In 1995, he also became the founder of the Japanese men's liberation organization Men's Lib Tokyo.

After his graduation from Waseda University, he went to New York City and worked as a reporter. He wrote books about domestic violence and child abuse in Japan. He leads men's liberation in Tokyo now.

Toyoda also complained about the "Yellow cab" controversy.

He wrote a book about serial killer Futoshi Matsunaga and his common-law wife Junko Ogata because their relationships seemed to be domestic violence.

Books
Toyoda, Masayoshi (June 16, 2009).  (Kodansha)

References

External links
Tokyo Journal; Teaching Japan's Salarymen to Be Their Own Men
Writer ponders role of men today

1966 births
Living people
Japanese journalists
Men's movement
Men's rights activists
People from Tokyo